"I'm Single" is a song by American rapper Lil Wayne, released as a single from his ninth solo mixtape, No Ceilings, and is also included on his eighth studio album I Am Not a Human Being. The song is produced by Noah "40" Shebib, with co-production from Omen. The song received generally positive reviews from music critics on its release, who complimented its relaxed, downbeat tone and also the production from Shebib and Omen.

Background 
The song was originally released under the name "Single" on No Ceilings: however, after the song was released as a digital single, the title was changed. A remix of the song featuring Drake was set to appear on I Am Not a Human Being: however, for unspecified reasons the original version was included instead, although Drake still receives a featured artist credit on the song.

Reception 
The song received generally positive reviews from music critics. Allmusic writer David Jeffries described the song as a "woozy porno dream", and named it one of three "killer cuts" from the album "driven by Wayne's luck with the ladies". Chris Molnar of cokemachineglow also wrote positively of the song, praising the "confidently opportunistic" lyrics and the "eerie" production and described the song itself as "a riveting, alien slow jam... an example of how mixtape Wayne and album Wayne can collide perfectly in these dark days of prisoner Wayne." Jon Caramanica of The New York Times called it "hypnotic" and "no-fi", describing it as "his most Drake-like record, woozy and sentimental... it’s a testament to his truly elastic capacities that he’s able to absorb Drake’s skill and template but not be fully reshaped by it."

Track listing 
Digital download'
 "I'm Single – 5:33

Charts

Weekly charts

Year-end charts

Certifications

Release history

References 

2011 singles
Lil Wayne songs
Songs written by Lil Wayne
Song recordings produced by 40 (record producer)
2009 songs
Songs written by 40 (record producer)
Songs written by Drake (musician)
Songs written by Boi-1da
Cash Money Records singles
Universal Motown Records singles